This is a list of major newspapers serving cities in the United States with populations over 100,000.

Abilene, Texas
Abilene Reporter-News

Albuquerque, New Mexico
Albuquerque Journal

Allen, Texas
Allen American
Dallas Morning News

Allentown, Pennsylvania
The Morning Call

Anchorage, Alaska 
Alaska Star
Anchorage Daily News
Anchorage Press
Petroleum News

Amarillo, Texas
Amarillo Globe-News

Ann Arbor, Michigan 
The Ann Arbor News
The Michigan Daily

Arlington, Texas
Arlington Citizen-Journal
Dallas Morning News
Fort Worth Star-Telegram

Atlanta, Georgia
Atlanta Journal-Constitution
Atlanta Nation
Creative Loafing
Marietta Daily Journal

Augusta, Georgia 
The Augusta Chronicle

Aurora, Colorado
Aurora Sentinel

Austin, Texas
Austin American-Statesman
Austin Business Journal
Austin Chronicle
Buena Suerte
Community Impact Newspaper
El Mundo
Hill Country News

Bakersfield, California
Bakersfield Californian

Baltimore, Maryland
The Baltimore Afro-American
Baltimore Business Journal
The Baltimore Sun
The Baltimore Times
Daily Record

Baton Rouge, Louisiana
The Advocate

Beaumont, Texas
Beaumont Enterprise
The Examiner
Southeast Texas Record

Birmingham, Alabama
The Birmingham News

Boise, Idaho
Idaho Statesman

Boston, Massachusetts
Boston Business Journal
The Boston Globe
Boston Herald

Brownsville, Texas
Brownsville Herald
El Nuevo Heraldo
Rio Grande Guardian
Valley Morning Star

Buffalo, New York
The Buffalo News
The Buffalonian

Carrollton, Texas
Carrollton Leader
Dallas Morning News
Fort Worth Star-Telegram

Charleston, South Carolina
The Post and Courier

Charlotte, North Carolina
The Charlotte Observer

Chattanooga, Tennessee
Chattanooga Times Free Press

Chicago, Illinois
Chicago Sun-Times
Chicago Tribune

Cincinnati, Ohio
The Cincinnati Enquirer
City Beat

Cleveland, Ohio
Cleveland Scene
The Plain Dealer

Colorado Springs, Colorado
The Gazette

College Station, Texas
The Eagle

Columbus, Georgia
Ledger-Enquirer

Columbus, Ohio
The Columbus Dispatch

Corpus Christi, Texas
Corpus Christi Caller-Times

Dallas, Texas
The Dallas Morning News
Dallas Business Journal
Dallas Examiner
Dallas Observer
Dallas Voice
Al Día
Buena Suerte
Daily Commercial Record
El Extra
Texas Jewish Post
World Journal

Dayton, Ohio
The Dayton Daily News

Denton, Texas
Denton Record-Chronicle
Dallas Morning News
Fort Worth Star-Telegram

Denver, Colorado
Denver Post

Des Moines, Iowa
The Des Moines Register

Detroit, Michigan
The Detroit Free Press
The Detroit News

Durham, North Carolina
The Herald-Sun (Durham, North Carolina)
The Carolina Times
Indy Week
The Triangle Tribune

Edinburg, Texas
Edinburg Review
McAllen Monitor
Rio Grande Guardian
Valley Morning Star

El Paso, Texas
El Paso Times
El Diario de El Paso

Erie, Pennsylvania
Erie Times-News

Eugene, Oregon
The Eugene Register-Guard

Fargo, North Dakota
The Forum of Fargo-Moorhead

Fayetteville, North Carolina
The Fayetteville Observer
The Voice
The Fayetteville Press
Acento Latino

Flint, Michigan
The Flint Journal

Fort Wayne, Indiana
Fort Wayne Journal Gazette
Fort Wayne News Sentinel

Fort Worth, Texas
Fort Worth Star-Telegram
Fort Worth Business Press
Commercial Recorder
Community Impact Newspaper
Tarrant County Commercial Record

Fresno, California
The Fresno Bee

Frisco, Texas
Frisco Enterprise
Dallas Morning News
Community Impact Newspaper

Garland, Texas
Garland Texan
Dallas Morning News

Grand Prairie, Texas
Dallas Morning News
Fort Worth Star-Telegram

Grand Rapids, Michigan
Grand Rapids Press

Greensboro, North Carolina
News & Record
Carolina Peacemaker
Yes! Weekly

Green Bay, Wisconsin
Green Bay Press-Gazette

Hartford, Connecticut
Hartford Courant

High Point, North Carolina
High Point Enterprise

Honolulu, Hawaii
Honolulu Star-Advertiser

Houston, Texas
Houston Chronicle
Houston Business Journal
Houston Defender
Houston Forward Times
Houston Press
African-American News and Issues
Buena Suerte
Examiner Newspaper Group
Jewish Herald-Voice
The Leader
La Voz de Houston
Rumbo
Village News and Southwest News
World Journal

Indianapolis, Indiana
The Indianapolis Star

Irving, Texas
Irving Rambler
Dallas Morning News
Fort Worth Star-Telegram
Tarrant County Commercial Record

Jacksonville, Florida
The Florida Times-Union

Kansas City, Missouri
Kansas City Star

Kenosha, Wisconsin
Kenosha News

Killeen, Texas
Killeen Daily Herald

Knoxville, Tennessee
Knoxville News Sentinel

Laredo, Texas
Laredo Morning Times

Las Vegas, Nevada
Las Vegas Review-Journal
Las Vegas Sun

League City, Texas
Houston Chronicle

Lewisville, Texas
Lewisville Leader
Community Impact Newspaper
Dallas Morning News
Fort Worth Star-Telegram

Lexington, Kentucky
Lexington Herald-Leader

Lincoln, Nebraska
Lincoln Journal Star

Little Rock, Arkansas
Arkansas Democrat-Gazette

Greater Los Angeles, California

Long Beach
Press-Telegram

Los Angeles
Los Angeles Times
La Opinion

Ontario
Inland Valley Daily Bulletin

Oxnard
Ventura County Star

Pasadena
Pasadena Star-News

Riverside
Press-Enterprise

San Bernardino
San Bernardino Sun

San Fernando Valley
Los Angeles Daily News

San Gabriel Valley
San Gabriel Valley Tribune

Santa Ana
The Orange County Register

Santa Clarita
The Santa Clarita Valley Signal

Torrance
Daily Breeze

Louisville, Kentucky
The Courier-Journal

Lowell, Massachusetts
The Sun

Lubbock, Texas
Lubbock Avalanche-Journal

Macon, Georgia
The Telegraph

Madison, Wisconsin
Wisconsin State Journal
The Capital Times
Isthmus

Manchester, New Hampshire
New Hampshire Union Leader

McAllen, Texas
McAllen Monitor
Rio Grande Guardian
Valley Morning Star

McKinney, Texas
McKinney Courier-Gazette
Collin County Commercial Record
Community Impact Newspaper

Memphis, Tennessee
The Commercial Appeal

Mesquite, Texas
Mesquite News
Dallas Morning News

Miami, Florida
The Miami Herald
El Nuevo Herald (Spanish)
South Florida Sun-Sentinel

Midland, Texas
Midland Reporter-Telegram

Milwaukee, Wisconsin
Milwaukee Journal Sentinel
Shepherd Express

Minneapolis-St. Paul, Minnesota 
Minneapolis
City Pages
Finance & Commerce
La Matraca Magazine
Minnesota Daily
Minnesota Spokesman-Recorder
Southwest Journal
Star Tribune

St. Paul
The Catholic Spirit
St. Paul Pioneer Press

Murfreesboro, Tennessee
The Daily News Journal

Nashville, Tennessee
The Tennessean

New Orleans, Louisiana
Gambit Weekly
Louisiana Weekly
The Times-Picayune  The New Orleans Advocate

Greater New York City, New York
AM New York
Brooklyn Eagle
Daily News
New York Post
The New York Times
The Wall Street Journal

Brooklyn
Brooklyn Eagle

Staten Island
Staten Island Advance

Long Island
Newsday

Newark, New Jersey
The Star-Ledger

Newport News, Virginia
Daily Press

Norfolk, Virginia
The Virginian-Pilot

Odessa, Texas
Odessa American

Oklahoma City, Oklahoma
The Oklahoma Gazette
The Oklahoman

Orlando, Florida
Orlando Sentinel

Omaha, Nebraska
Omaha World-Herald

Pasadena, Texas
Pasadena Citizen
Houston Chronicle

Philadelphia, Pennsylvania
Philadelphia Daily News
The Philadelphia Inquirer

Phoenix, Arizona
The Arizona Republic

Pittsburgh, Pennsylvania
Pittsburgh Post-Gazette
Pittsburgh Tribune-Review

Plano, Texas
Plano Star Courier
Community Impact Newspaper
Dallas Morning News

Portland, Oregon
The Oregonian
The Portland Tribune
Willamette Week

Providence, Rhode Island
The Providence Journal

Raleigh, North Carolina
Indy Week
The News & Observer
Raleigh Chronicle
Triangle Downtowner Magazine

Reno, Nevada
Reno Gazette-Journal

Richardson, Texas
Community Impact Newspaper
Dallas Morning News

Richmond, Virginia
Richmond Times-Dispatch

Roanoke, Virginia
The Roanoke Times

Rochester, Minnesota
Post-Bulletin

Rochester, New York
Rochester Democrat and Chronicle

Round Rock, Texas
Round Rock Leader
Williamson County Sun
Austin American-Statesman
Community Impact Newspaper

Sacramento, California
The Sacramento Bee

St. Louis, Missouri
St. Louis Post-Dispatch

Salt Lake City, Utah
Deseret Morning News
The Salt Lake Tribune

San Angelo, Texas
San Angelo Standard-Times

San Antonio, Texas
San Antonio Express-News
San Antonio Business Journal
Buena Suerte
El Mundo
Hart Beat
La Prensa de San Antonio
Northeast Herald
Rumbo

San Diego, California
The San Diego Union-Tribune

San Francisco Bay Area (California)

Oakland
East Bay Times

San Francisco
San Francisco Chronicle
San Francisco Examiner

San Jose
San Jose Mercury News

San Juan, Puerto Rico 
Puerto Rico Daily Sun

Savannah, Georgia 
Savannah Morning News

Seattle, Washington
The Seattle Times
The Stranger (newspaper)

Shreveport, Louisiana
The Times

Sioux Falls, South Dakota
The Argus Leader
Sioux Falls Business Journal
La Voz Hispana

South Bend, Indiana
South Bend Tribune

Spokane, Washington
The Spokesman-Review
Inlander

Stockton, California
The Record

Sugar Land, Texas
Fort Bend Sun
Fort Bend Herald and Texas Coaster
Fort Bend Star
Community Impact Newspaper
Houston Chronicle

Tacoma, Washington
The News Tribune

Tallahassee, Florida
Tallahassee Democrat

Tampa Bay Area (Florida) 
Tampa Bay Times

Toledo, Ohio
The Blade
Toledo City Paper

Tucson, Arizona
Arizona Daily Star

Tulsa, Oklahoma
Metro Star
Tulsa Beacon
Tulsa Business Journal
Tulsa Daily Commerce and Legal News
Tulsa Free Press
Tulsa Front Page
Tulsa World
Urban Tulsa

Tyler, Texas
Tyler Morning Telegraph

Waco, Texas
Waco Tribune-Herald

Washington, D.C.
Washington City Paper
The Washington Post
The Washington Times

Wichita, Kansas
The Wichita Eagle

Wichita Falls, Texas
Times Record News

Wilmington, North Carolina
Star-News
The Wilmington Journal

Winston-Salem, North Carolina
Winston-Salem Journal
Winston-Salem Chronicle
AC Phoenix

Worcester, Massachusetts
Telegram & Gazette

References

Lists of newspapers published in the United States